The Erwinna Covered Bridge is a wooden covered bridge that spans Swamp Creek in Erwinna, Pennsylvania, United States.

The bridge was constructed using a lattice-type design.

The National Register of Historic Places lists the date built as 1871, while county records say 1832.

The bridge's WGCB Number is 39-09-04.

During the winter the bridge has been decorated by the Church Of Tinicum on Geigel Hill Road, with lighted pineroping  and wreaths at each side of the bridge.

In September 2012 a 13' box truck took out the infrastructure of the bridge, causing PennDOT to estimate the bridge will be closed for 4–6 months. It was repaired just 3 months after the accident.

In the early morning hours of Sunday, May 12, 2013, vandals sprayed graffiti on all of the bridge's decorative doors and the concrete around the bridge. The same tags were found on a nearby bridge on Headquarters Road, which intersects with Geigel Hill Road in Erwinna.

On July 22, 2013, the bridge received structural damage after being struck by a delivery truck, and was closed indefinitely pending an inspection and repair estimate by PennDOT engineers.

References

External links
Erwinna Bridge

Covered bridges in Bucks County, Pennsylvania
Covered bridges on the National Register of Historic Places in Pennsylvania
Bridges completed in 1832
Wooden bridges in Pennsylvania
Bridges in Bucks County, Pennsylvania
Tourist attractions in Bucks County, Pennsylvania
National Register of Historic Places in Bucks County, Pennsylvania
Road bridges on the National Register of Historic Places in Pennsylvania
Lattice truss bridges in the United States